Silk Canvas is the 2018 debut album by Nigerian-American R&B duo VanJess. The album was self-released by the duo, who spent two years working on the album. On November 8, 2019, the duo released Silk Canvas (The Remixes) including features from Ari Lennox, Bas, Saba, Xavier Omär, and more.

The album contains features from Masego, GoldLink, Berhana, Leikeli47, and Little Simz. The production came from Jay "Kurzweil" Oyebadejo, IAMNOBODI, and KAYTRANADA, among others.

Background
The album was influenced by the duo's Nigerian heritage.

Critical reception
Silk Canvas received positive reviews from music critics. Pitchfork praised the album giving it a 7.7 out of 10, saying: "the sisters wield enough magic to make Silk Canvas a success: a surefooted proclamation of sensuality, musicality, and sisterly love that can hold its own with the best of new-wave R&B." The author also talked about the two singers saying: "Their sensual, confident, and, at its smoky best, near-perfect R&B is the clear work not only of years of practice, but a singular bond. They know how to play off one another. Ivana, with a deep, rounded voice that can cut across a song like a thunderclap, usually sings lead, while Jessica, whose lighter, scratchier voice recalls TLC’s T-Boz, injects personality and flair. When they’re in sync, they seamlessly share verses with a hairflip and a sultry smirk."

Track listing

References

2018 albums